Reyes Nunez (born August 28, 1978), better known by the ring name Ricky Reyes, is a Cuban-American retired professional wrestler. He is known for his appearances in Ring of Honor, Pro Wrestling Guerrilla, World Wrestling Council, Lucha Underground and various other independent promotions.

Professional wrestling career

Ring of Honor (2002–2006)

Reyes is one half of the Havana Pitbulls with Rocky Romero. At Ring of Honor (ROH)'s Reborn: Stage One, the Havana Pitbulls made their ROH debut against then tag champions The Briscoe Brothers in a non title match, which they lost. They later joined Homicide's alliance, The Rottweilers. The group also featured Julius Smokes, who would manage Reyes along with the rest of the members.

Reyes and Romero wrestled for the ROH Tag Team Championship at Testing The Limit against the champions CM Punk and Colt Cabana. They won the match and became the new champions. They eventually lost the title to Maff and Whitmer.

Reyes took part in the Trios Tournament in 2005 with partners Romero and Homicide. They won the tournament defeating Generation Next in the final match. The three winners of this tournament got to choose any match they wanted. While Homicide and Romero went after the World Title, Reyes wanted a tag title shot against Tony Mamaluke and Sal Rinauro. He picked Homicide as his partner, but they did not win.

In late 2005, Reyes began fighting students from the ROH Wrestling School. They were no challenge for him, and he defeated them all quickly. He claimed that no one could escape his Dragon Sleeper. These actions angered then head trainer Austin Aries of Generation Next.

At Hell Freezes Over, Austin Aries of Generation Next challenged Reyes to a match. After Aries pinned Reyes, Reyes would not release a sleeper hold and Roderick Strong, a fellow Generation Next member, came out to break things up. A return match was held at Best in the World. The feud came to an end at the 100th Show when Aries and Strong defeated Reyes and Homicide to retain the tag title.

Combat Zone Wrestling (2006)

On September 9, 2006, Reyes debuted in Combat Zone Wrestling (CZW) and joined The Blackout by helping Eddie Kingston win the CZW World Heavyweight Championship. Reyes left CZW on October 21, 2006 to join Pro Wrestling Unplugged, teaming with Joker at the Pitbull/Public Enemy Tag Team Memorial Cup.

World Wrestling Council (2007–2013)
He won the WWC World Junior Heavyweight Championship winning an X match against Hiram Tua, Tommy Diablo, Carlitos, Johnny Styles and Angel. He lost the title to Angel on April 18, 2009.

Victory Pro Wrestling (2005-Present)
Reyes has been competing in New York's Victory Pro Wrestling based out of Long Island, New York. Reyes has been the head training in the promotion and has faced some of Pro Wrestling's finest such as A.J. Styles, and Chris Hero, as well as becoming a grand slam Champion.

WWE (2012)
On the May 25, 2012 episode of WWE SmackDown, Reyes competed in a handicapped match along with Kevin Bendl on the losing end of a two-man team versus Ryback. Reyes competed under the name Brian Edwards.

Lucha Underground (2014–2019)
In September 2014, it was reported that Diaz had signed with El Rey network's new show Lucha Underground, that began airing on October 29. He worked the tapings under the ring name Cortez Castro. In Season 2 it was revealed that Castro is an Undercover Los Angeles Police Officer named Reyes, he is also part of a special task force along with Joey Ryan, both on a mission to bring down Dario Cueto. However, Ryan betrayed him and revealed his identity. Castro returned to the Temple as the masked wrestler Veneno, but was discovered by Ryan. On Episode 34, season 03, Castro defeated Joey Ryan to win an Aztec Medallion. On episode 5 of season 04, Castro was killed by Matanza (Jeff Cobb) in a Sacrifice to the Gods match.

Championships and accomplishments

302 Professional Wrestling
302 Cruiserweight Championship (2 times, current)
3KWrestling Fighting Athletes
3KWrestling Openweight Championship (1 time, current)
Shinya Hashimoto Memorial Tournament (2008)
3L! Lucha Libre Live
3L! Lucha Libre Live Championship (1 time, current)
 American Championship Entertainment
ACE Fight or Flight Championship (1 time, current)
ACE Diamond Championship (1 time)
American Pro Wrestling Alliance
APWA World Super Junior Championship (2 times)
Blackball'd Wrestling Organization
BWO Heavyweight Championship (1 time)
Carolina Wrestling Showcase
CWS Legacy Championship (1 time, current)
Eastern Pennsylvania Wrestling Entertainment
EPWE World Heavyweight Champion (1 time)
Empire Wrestling Federation
EWF Heavyweight Championship (1 time)
EWF Tag Team Championship (5 times) – with Rocky Romero
Funkdafied Wrestling Federation
FWF Tag Team Championship (1 time) – with Johnny Gunn
Independent Wrestling Association Mid-South
 IWA Mid-South Tag Team Championship (1 time) - with Joker
International Wrestling Cartel
IWC Heavyweight Championship (1 time)
National Championship Wrestling
NCW Heavyweight Championship (1 time)
North American Wrestling Allegiance
NAWA Cruiserweight Championship (1 time)
Outbreak Wrestling
OutBreak Championship (1 time)
Pro Wrestling Illustrated
PWI ranked him #177 of the top 500 singles wrestlers in the PWI 500 in 2005
Pro Wrestling Unplugged
PWU Tag Team Championship (1 time) – with Joker
Ring of Honor
ROH Tag Team Championship (1 time) – with Rocky Romero
Trios Tournament (2005) – with Rocky Romero and Homicide
SoCal Uncensored
Tag Team of the Year (2001) with Rocky Romero
Susquehanna Wrestling Organization
SWO Uprising Championship (1 time)
Ultimate Pro Wrestling
UPW Lightweight Championship (1 time)
UPW Tag Team Championship (1 time) – with Rocky Romero
United Pro Wrestling Association
UPWA Cruiserweight Championship (1 time)
Victory Pro Wrestling
VPW Championship (1 time)
VPW New York State Champion (1 time)
VPW Tag Team Champion (1 time) – with E.J. Risk
Gold Rush Rumble (2010)
World Wrestling Council
WWC World Junior Heavyweight Championship (2 times)
Other promotions
Southern states champion (1 time)

References

External links

Online World of Wrestling profile

1978 births
American male professional wrestlers
Cuban male professional wrestlers
Living people
People from Havana
ROH World Tag Team Champions